Run is a 2019 British drama thriller film. It is directed by Scott Graham, and stars Mark Stanley and Amy Manson. The producers are Margaret Matheson, Rosie Crerar and Ciara Barry.

Principal photography was completed in April 2018, produced under the title We Don't Talk About Love. The film premiered at the 2019 Tribeca Film Festival.

References

External links
 

2019 films
British thriller drama films
2010s English-language films
2010s British films